Ronald Cooke may refer to:

 Ronald Cooke (British Army officer) (1899–1971), British general
 Sir Ron Cooke (born 1941), an English professor of geography and geomorphology
 Ronnie Cooke, a South African rugby union player